Federation Internationale des Organisations de Festivals (FIDOF, "International Federation of Festival Organizations") was an organization to hold and organize festivals worldwide.  It was established in 1966, and headquartered in Split, Yugoslavia with Secretary General professor Armando Moreno. Later, it was headquartered in California, United States, where it was registered as a Section 501(c) non-profit organization. It was the member of the U.S. National Music Council. The organization ceased to exist in 2005 after the death of its founder.

The main role of FIDOF was to provide coordination of festivals and other cultural events through arranging their dates and publicizing them through the International English Monthly Bulletins, which were distributed among the members.

FIDOF had 220 individual members and more than 1,000 affiliated organizations.  It was also associated with 320 festivals held in 72 countries.

FIDOF members

Slavianski Bazaar in Vitebsk (since 1998)
MakFest
Splitski festival (Split song festival) (since 1966.)

References

Festival organizations
International non-profit organizations
Organizations established in 1966
Charities based in California
1966 establishments in California